The Armada Hoffler Tower is a high rise multi-office building in Town Center, Virginia Beach, Virginia. Opened in 2003, it is known as the first building built in the new Virginia Beach Town Center. It is also the home of the local news station WTKR's secondary studio.

References

Buildings and structures in Virginia Beach, Virginia
Skyscrapers in Virginia
Commercial buildings completed in 2003
Skyscraper office buildings in Virginia